The King's School may refer to:

Schools

UK
The original seven schools established or renamed by King Henry VIII in 1541:
 The King's School, Canterbury
 King's School, Chester
 King's Ely, Cambridgeshire
 King's School, Gloucester
 The King's (The Cathedral) School, Peterborough
 King's School, Rochester
 King's School, Worcester

Other schools of this name in the United Kingdom include:
 King's School, Bruton, Somerset
King's College School, Cambridge, Cambridgeshire
 The King's School, Fair Oak, Hampshire
 The King's School, Grantham, Lincolnshire
 The King's School (Harpenden), Hertfordshire
 King's School, Hove, East Sussex
 The King's Church of England School, Wolverhampton, West Midlands
 King's School, Macclesfield, Cheshire
 The King's School, Ottery St Mary, Devon
 King's School, Pontefract, West Yorkshire
 Kings Priory School, Tynemouth, Tyne and Wear
King's College School, Wimbledon, London
 Kings' School, Winchester, Hampshire
 King's School, Witney, Oxfordshire

Other countries

Australasia

 King's School (Auckland), Remuera, Auckland, New Zealand
King's High School, Dunedin, New Zealand

 The King's School, Parramatta, Sydney, New South Wales, Australia

Others
 King's School (Burundi)

 King's School (Gütersloh), Gütersloh, Germany

 The King's School, Manila, Philippines
 King's School, Mugalli, Goa, India

 King's Schools, a private Christian school in North Seattle, Washington
King's High School, one of the component schools

Other uses
 King's School (PAT station), a light railway stop in Bethel Park, Pennsylvania

See also
 The King's Academy (disambiguation)
 King's College (disambiguation)
 Kings (disambiguation)
 King Schools, Inc.
 King Schoolhouse